Killarney Municipal Airport  is located  south southwest of Killarney, Manitoba, Canada.

References

Registered aerodromes in Manitoba